Eretmocera basistrigata is a moth of the family Scythrididae. It was described by Baron Walsingham in 1889. It is found in Cape Verde, Gambia, Kenya and Namibia.

The larvae feed on Clerodendrum species.

References

basistrigata
Moths described in 1889